Franz Steiner Verlag GmbH is a German academic publishing house, with headquarters in Stuttgart.

Founded in 1949 in Wiesbaden, its specialty is history, although it also publishes works in geography, philosophy, law, and musicology.  In 2008, the program was expanded to include nonfiction books for a wider readership. Today, the publishing house is part of the Deutscher Apotheker Verlag media group.

Journals published by Franz Steiner include Historia, Geographische Zeitschrift, Hermes, and Zeitschrift für französische Sprache und Literatur.

References

External links

 (German)

Publishing companies established in 1949
Book publishing companies of Germany
Publishing companies of Germany
Companies based in Wiesbaden
Companies based in Stuttgart
Mass media in Stuttgart
1949 establishments in Germany